VSP Vision Care (VSP) is a vision care health insurance company operating in Australia, Canada, Ireland, the United States, and the United Kingdom. It is a doctor-governed company divided into five businesses: “eye care insurance, high-quality eyewear, lens and lens enhancements, ophthalmic technology, and connected experiences to strengthen the relationship between patients and their eye doctors.” It has about 80 million people worldwide and is the largest vision insurance company in the United States. 

Formed in 1955 as a nonprofit organization by a group of optometrists in Oakland, California, it became a national provider, and expanded internationally by 2007. In 2003 the Internal Revenue Service revoked VSP's tax exempt status citing exclusionary, members-only practices, and high compensation to executives.

History
In 1954, two organizations were formed, the Alameda Contra Costa Optometric Society and the Joint Council on Vision Care. A year later, the two groups decided to merge, creating the California Vision Services, or CVS. The formation of CVS was from a group of optometrists in the San Francisco Bay Area who decided to offer prepaid vision benefits in a small shopping center in Oakland, California. It began as an employee benefits program that drew its first members from labor and management trust funds and school districts. The program offered by the founding group of optometrists restricted the development of CVS to some extent and perhaps more of hindrance to the program's acceptance was the general perception of vision care as a benefit. Employers, labor unions, and parties involved in collective bargaining arrangements generally focused first on medical coverage before moving down the line to employee benefits related to death, disability, dental, pharmaceutical, pensions, profit sharing, and vacations. Eye care, if the subject was broached at all, typically was at the end of the line. CVS became a champion of vision care coverage because of these practices.

Three years after its founding the organization began to offer itself for purchase or merger with other organizations but none showed any interest. Undeterred by the lack of interest, CVS forged forward with expansion plans and signed its first multistate contract in 1958 with Masters, Mates, and Pilots Local 90 Union. In the agreement, CVS would pay claims in the port cities of Boston, New York, Philadelphia, New Orleans, Galveston, Seattle, and Portland. Seven years later, after numerous smaller agreements added to the legitimacy of the company's concept, in 1965, CVS signed a contract with the Western Conference of Teamsters, who agreed to include the company's vision care program in its benefits package. With its novel concept at the time exceeding initial expectations, CVS was forced to move to larger headquarters in 1968 from Oakland to Sacramento.

By the late 1960s, efforts were underway to expand beyond California's borders and in 1968, the company signed an agreement with Hawaii for future work in the state. In 1974, it assumed control over the administration of Nevada Vision Service which led to CVS signing its first client in the state. In 1976, CVS officially became VSP and the company widened its operating territory to a four-state area by assuming responsibility for Oregon Vision Service Plan. In 1972, the company opened its own optical laboratory in Sacramento in a bid to keep its costs down. In later years, the Sacramento lab would produce more than 2,000 pairs of eyeglasses a day. In 1979, under the VSP name, the company signed its first contract with a health maintenance organization (HMO), marking its entry into the managed care market, which represented a major market for VSP at the end of the century. By the end of the 1970s, VSP rapidly grew in the vision care market, boasting 2.4 million members.

During the 1980s, the company expressed its intention to become a national company, the first time a vision care specialist made a concerted bid to develop a 50-state membership base. The expansion program touched off in 1985, when a regional office was opened to serve New York, New Jersey, Connecticut, and Rhode Island. The following year, an office was opened in Atlanta, which served as the company's southeastern hub for a six-state region. In 1987, St. Louis became the center of the company's business in the Midwest, presiding over a six-state area. The following year, VSP merged with Mid-Atlantic Vision Service Plan, which spread the company's presence into Washington, D.C., Virginia, and Maryland. After adding an office in Wisconsin in 1989, VSP ended the decade with eight million members, more than three times its membership base at the start of the decade. During the 1990s, the company's expansion efforts, in terms of both geography and the breadth of its services, brought with it nearly 1,000 employees  and in 1990, the company created a program named Managed Eyecare that encompassed the spectrum of vision care services, including complex eye treatment that required surgery. The year also marked the establishment of a regional office in Seattle that governed a four-state territory in the Pacific Northwest. In 1992, the company formed a subsidiary named Altair Eyewear, which was created to sell private-label frames to VSP's network of doctors.

By 2000, VSP began its largest and most intense expansion program ever. Launches like Eyefinity, a separate company that provides business solutions to VSP network providers, and the opening of a second high-tech optical lab, located outside Columbus, Ohio. In 2007, VSP expanded into Canada and, by 2013, the United Kingdom, Ireland and Australia. By 2009, with international expansion, it was decided to change from VSP (Vision Service Plan) to VSP Global.

In 2017, VSP Global stayed "ahead of the curve" and made an investment in RightEye, "an eye-tracking technology that uses game-based vision tests to reveal details on visual speed and accuracy, processing depth perception, and even dry eye." 

In 2019, VSP acquired Visionworks, an optical retailer in the U.S. Also in 2019, VSP launched VSP Ventures, a partnership program for optometrists looking to preserve the legacy of their private practices when their focus begins to shift to retirement.

International expansion

Canada
In late 2007, VSP began to venture into Canada where it had served only Canadian-based employees of U.S. firms. By 2012, VSP covered approximately 2,000 Canadians. In 2013, VSP Vision Care Canada entered into a partnership with FYidoctors, a private, optometry-owned eyecare provider with more than 400 optometrists at 212 locations throughout Canada. VSP would market, sell and administer its vision care insurance platform to employers across Canada.

United Kingdom and Ireland
In 2013, VSP expanded its eyecare offerings to the United Kingdom and Ireland, doing business as VSP Neighbourhood Eyecare, similar to the Australia and Canada ventures. VSP partnered with the Association of Optometrists (AOP), National Eyecare Group (NEG); the U.K. branch of Italy's Assicurazioni General S.p.A. insurance provider, Generali U.K.; and Thomsons Online Benefits, which specializes in helping companies around the world run their employee benefits programs.

Acquisitions
In July 2008, VSP announced its acquisition of the Ft. Lauderdale, Fla.-based Ultra Lens lab and partnered with the optical lab Perfect Optics in California.

In August 2008, VSP acquired the Melville, New York company Marchon Eyewear Inc. for $735 million with a combination of cash and debt after receiving regulatory approval from the California Department of Managed Care and the Connecticut Department of Insurance. The VSP-owned Altair Eyewear became a division of Marchon and remains in its Rancho Cordova headquarters. VSP also gained ownership of the frame company Allure Eyewear, as well as OfficeMate Software Solutions. Marchon manufactures and sells branded and proprietary eyewear and sunwear for such brands as Calvin Klein Collection, Calvin Klein platinum, Calvin Klein Jeans, Columbia Sportswear, Converse, Cutler and Gross, Donna Karan, Dragon, Flexon, Lacoste, Liu·Jo, Longchamp, Marchon NYC, Marni, MCM Worldwide, Nautica, Nike, Nine West, Salvatore Ferragamo, Sean John, Skaga, Victoria Beckham. Under the terms of the acquisition, Marchon became a wholly owned subsidiary. Marchon operates from its New York-based headquarters as an independent entity within the VSP organization.

In 2019, VSP acquired Visionworks, an optical retailer in the U.S.

Non-profit status

As early as 1999, the IRS had started to look into VSP and its non-profit status. It all came to a head when an article printed in Optometric Management revealed the financial information of VSP. The article claimed that VSP reported on its website that in 2002 revenues were $1.86 billion and that it provided eyecare coverage for one in eight persons living in the United States. VSP said that along with this growth, payments to doctors are increasing and systems are being implemented to raise O.D. margins. However, an increasing number of O.D.s claimed that margins were actually cut and administrative requirements made so burdensome that they have or were considering dropping VSP. They wonder why financial and operational decisions that affect optometrists across the country (for example, the WellVision Savings Statement) are made without their input.

In 2005, a federal district judge in Sacramento, California found that VSP failed to prove that it was not organized for profit nor for the promotion of the greater social welfare, as is required of a 501(c)(4). Instead, the district court found, VSP operates much like a for-profit (with, for example, its executives getting bonuses tied to net income) and primarily for the benefit of its own member/subscribers, not for some greater social good and, thereafter, concluded it was not entitled to tax-exempt status under 501(c)(4).

In November 2005, the parties presented cases before a federal district judge. VSP asked to be confirmed as a social welfare organization under 26 U.S.C. §501(c)(4) and asked for return of the 2003 tax payments and an order that the United States issue it a private letter recognizing VSP's 501(c)(4) status. The government asked for summary judgment on the grounds that VSP did not qualify for tax exemption under 501(c)(4). Judge Lawrence Karlton ruled against VSP on December 12, 2005. VSP argued that it qualified for exemption under 501(c)(4) because its operations were primarily for the promotion of social welfare through direct (contracted) services to broad segments of the community as well as through charity work. While Judge Karlton described VSP's charitable work as admirable, he found that VSP failed to establish it operated primarily for the promotion of civic betterments and social improvements within the meaning of the tax regulations.

References

External links 
VSP Global
VSP Ventures

Health care companies based in California
Insurance companies of the United States
Companies based in Sacramento County, California
American companies established in 1955
Financial services companies established in 1955
Eye care in the United States
1955 establishments in California